Shibayama may refer to:
Shibayama, Chiba, a town in Japan
Shibayama Tsutomu, Japanese anime director
Shibayama Railway, a railway company in Chiba Prefecture, Japan
Shibayama, a technique to decorate objects named after its inventor